
The 36th NAACP Image Awards ceremony, presented by the National Association for the Advancement of Colored People (NAACP), honored the best in film, television, music of 2004 and took place on March 19, 2005 at the Dorothy Chandler Pavilion.

The following is a listing of nominees, with winners in bold:

Winners

Film
Outstanding Motion Picture
Ray 
Collateral
Fahrenheit 9/11
Hotel Rwanda
Man on Fire

Outstanding Actor in a Motion Picture 
Jamie Foxx – Ray
Don Cheadle - Hotel Rwanda
Mario Van Peebles - Baadasssss!
Denzel Washington - Man on Fire
Will Smith - I, Robot

Outstanding Actress in a Motion Picture 
Kerry Washington – Ray
Angela Bassett - Mr. 3000
Kimberly Elise - Woman Thou Art Loosed
Gabrielle Union - Breakin' All the Rules
Irma P. Hall - The Ladykillers

Outstanding Supporting Actor in a Motion Picture 
Morgan Freeman – Million Dollar Baby
Don Cheadle - Ocean's Twelve 
Clifton Powell - Ray 
C.J. Sanders - Ray 
Jamie Foxx - Collateral

Outstanding Supporting Actress in a Motion Picture 
Regina King – Ray
Loretta Devine - Woman Thou Art Loosed
Sophie Okonedo - Hotel Rwanda
Jada Pinkett Smith - Collateral
Sharon Warren - Ray

Outstanding Independent or Foreign Motion Picture 
Woman Thou Art Loosed
Baadasssss!
House of Flying Daggers
Maria Full of Grace
Moolaadé

Television
Outstanding Comedy Series 
The Bernie Mac Show
Chappelle's Show
Half & Half
Girlfriends
My Wife and Kids 

Outstanding Drama Series
Law & Order
Kevin Hill
Soul Food
The Wire
ER 

Outstanding Actor in a Comedy Series 
Bernie Mac – The Bernie Mac Show
Flex Alexander - One on One 
Dave Chappelle - Chappelle's Show
George Lopez - The George Lopez Show 
Damon Wayans - My Wife and Kids

Outstanding Actress in a Comedy Series
Mo'Nique – The Parkers
Eve- Eve 
Tisha Campbell-Martin- My Wife and Kids
Tracee Ellis Ross- Girlfriends
Kellita Smith- The Bernie Mac Show 

Outstanding Supporting Actor in a Comedy Series
Reggie Hayes – Girlfriends
Donald Faison -  Scrubs
Blair Underwood - Sex and the City 
Dorien Wilson - The Parkers 
Chico Benymon - Half & Half 

Outstanding Supporting Actress in a Comedy Series
Camille Winbush – The Bernie Mac Show
Wanda Sykes - Curb Your Enthusiasm 
Telma Hopkins - Half & Half
Valarie Pettiford - Half & Half
Essence Atkins - Half & Half

Outstanding Actor in a Drama Series
Taye Diggs – Kevin Hill
Gary Dourdan - CSI: Crime Scene Investigation
Steve Harris - The Practice 
Jesse L. Martin - Law & Order
Hill Harper - CSI: NY 

Outstanding Actress in a Drama Series
Nia Long – Third Watch
Vivica A. Fox - 1-800-Missing 
Malinda Williams - Soul Food 
Nicole Ari Parker - Soul Food  
Vanessa A. Williams - Soul Food 

Outstanding Supporting Actor in a Drama Series
Mekhi Phifer – ER
Idris Elba - The Wire 
Darrin Henson - Soul Food
Dulé Hill - The West Wing 
Omar Epps - House 

Outstanding Supporting Actress in a Drama Series 
Khandi Alexander – CSI: Miami
Diahann Carroll- Soul Food 
Pam Grier- The L Word 
Jasmine Guy- Dead Like Me
Sonja Sohn- The Wire
  
Outstanding Actor – Daytime Drama Series: Shemar Moore – The Young and the Restless
Outstanding Actor – Television Movie, Miniseries or Dramatic Special: Jamie Foxx – Redemption: The Stan Tookie Williams Story
Outstanding Actress – Daytime Drama Series: Victoria Rowell – The Young and the Restless
Outstanding Actress – Television Movie, Miniseries or Dramatic Special: Lynn Whitfield – Redemption: The Stan Tookie Williams Story
Outstanding Performance – Youth/Children's Series or Special: Raven-Symoné – That's So Raven
Outstanding Television Movie, Miniseries or Dramatic Special: Something the Lord Made
Outstanding Television News, Talk, or Information Series or Special: Tavis Smiley
Outstanding Variety Series or Special: Genius: A Night for Ray Charles

Music
Outstanding Album: Musicology – Prince
Outstanding Artist – Gospel: Ben Harper & The Blind Boys of Alabama – There Will Be a Light
Outstanding Artist – Jazz: Nancy Wilson – R.S.V.P. (Rare Songs, Very Personal)
Outstanding Artist – Female: Fantasia – Free Yourself
Outstanding Artist – Male: Usher – Confessions
Outstanding Artist – New: Kanye West – The College Dropout
Outstanding Duo or Group: Destiny's Child – Destiny Fulfilled
Outstanding Music Video: Alicia Keys – "If I Ain't Got You"
Outstanding Song: "If I Ain't Got You" – Alicia Keys

References 

N
N
N
NAACP Image Awards